The seventh series of the British television drama series Waterloo Road began broadcasting on 4 May 2011, and ended on 25 April 2012 on BBC One. The series follows the lives of the faculty and pupils of the eponymous school, a failing inner-city comprehensive school. It consists of thirty episodes, shown in three blocks of ten episodes each. The seventh series achieved an average of 5.30 million viewers in the ratings. It is the last series to be set in Rochdale, England.

Plot
The show follows the lives of the teachers and the pupils at the eponymous school of Waterloo Road, a failing inner-city comprehensive.

Cast and characters

Staff
 Amanda Burton as Karen Fisher; Headteacher (10 episodes)
 William Ash as Christopher Mead; Deputy Headteacher and Science teacher (10 episodes)
 Jason Done as Tom Clarkson; Deputy Headteacher and English teacher (30 episodes)
 Philip Martin Brown as Grantly Budgen; Acting Head of English (30 episodes)
 Mark Benton as Daniel "Chalky" Chalk; Mathematics teacher (29 episodes)
 Chelsee Healey as Janeece Bryant; School secretary (27 episodes)
 Alec Newman as Michael Byrne; Headteacher (20 episodes)
 Chris Geere as Matt Wilding; Head of Music and Drama (20 episodes)
 Jaye Jacobs as Sian Diamond; Deputy Headteacher and Head of Science (20 episodes)
 Alex Walkinshaw as Jez Diamond; Head of Physical Education (18 episodes)
 Robson Green as Rob Scotcher; Site manager (10 episodes)
 Melanie Hill as Maggie Croft; Senior Canteen Assistant (10 episodes)
 Poppy Jhakra as Eleanor Chaudry; English teacher (10 episodes)
 Sarah Hadland as Linda Radleigh; Head of English (9 episodes)
 Heather Peace as Nikki Boston; Head of English and Media Studies (8 episodes)
 Elaine Symons as Rose Kelly; Canteen Assistant (6 episodes)
 Daniela Denby-Ashe as Lorraine Donnegan; School benefactor (3 episodes)

Pupils
 Reece Douglas as Denzil Kelly (29 episodes)
 Millie Katana as Shona Mansfield (29 episodes)
 Darcy Isa as Lauren Andrews (28 episodes)
 Hope Katana as Rhona Mansfield (28 episodes)
 Jack McMullen as Finn Sharkey (28 episodes)
 William Rush as Josh Stevenson (25 episodes)
 Shannon Flynn as Emily James (24 episodes)
 Katie McGlynn as Jodie "Scout" Allen (24 episodes)
 Ben-Ryan Davies as Ronan Burley (21 episodes)
 Kaya Moore as Phoenix Taylor (20 episodes)
 Aryana Ramkhalawon as Trudi Siddiqui (20 episodes)
 Rebecca Ryan as Vicki MacDonald (20 episodes)
 Naveed Choudhry as Tariq Siddiqui (19 episodes)
 Lee Abbate as Zack Diamond (19 episodes)
 Georgia Henshaw as Madi Diamond (19 episodes)
 George Sampson as Kyle Stack (18 episodes)
 Kane Tomlinson-Weaver as Harley Taylor (18 episodes)
 Linzey Cocker as Jess Fisher (10 episodes)
 Oliver Lee as Aiden Scotcher (10 episodes)
 Shifaa Arfann as Naseem Siddiqui (9 episodes)
 Ayesha Gwilt as Amy Porter (9 episodes)
 Ceallach Spellman as Harry Fisher (8 episodes)
 Holly Kenny as Sambuca Kelly (6 episodes)

Others

Recurring
 Nicholas Gleaves as Richard Whitman; Director of Education (6 episodes)
 Robert Haythorne as Wayne Johnson; Michael's attacker (6 episodes)
 Matt Kennard as Craig O'Leary; Janeece's fiancé and con artist (6 episodes)
 Stefan Gumbs as Eugene Garvey; Gang leader (5 episodes)
 Jo-Anne Knowles as Rosie Matthews; Matt's pregnant best friend (5 episodes)
 Lisa Riley as Tina Allen; Scout's mother (4 episodes)
 Debra Stephenson as Naomi Scotcher; Rob's ex-wife and Aiden's mother (4 episodes)
 James Gaddas as Alan Dixon; Director of Education (3 episodes)
 John Thomson as Nelson Smith; Phoenix and Harley's father (3 episodes)
 Ian Aspinall as Dr. Kanda; Sambuca's oncologist (2 episodes)
 Andrew McNair as Darren; Scout's drug dealer (2 episodes)
 Jonathan Wrather as Dr. Alex Stoneham; Neonatal consultant caring for Matt and Rosie's baby (2 episodes)

Guest
 Kirstie Armstrong as Ali Redback; Pupil (1 episode)
 Jane Asher as Margaret Harker; Investor (1 episode)
 Gemma Atkinson as Mandy; Businesswoman (1 episode)
 Kaine Barr as Mason Price; Pupil (1 episode)
 Mish Boyko as Danilo Babicz; Pupil (1 episode)
 Kaya Brady as Mia Willington; Woman who hires Scout as a live-in carer (1 episode)
 Daniel Brocklebank as Karl Johnson; Chair of Governors (1 episode)
 Lorraine Cheshire as Fleur Budgen; Grantly's wife (1 episode)
 Margi Clarke as Bette Mansfield; Rhona and Shona's grandmother (1 episode)
 Matthew Crompton as Simon Walker; Scout's foster father (1 episode)
 Amelia Curtis as Vanessa Cooper; Head of English candidate (1 episode)
 Louise Delamere as Marion James; Emily's mother (1 episode)
 Tupele Dorgu as Keely James; Garden centre manager (1 episode)
 Kriss Dosanjh as Mr. Siddiqui; Tariq, Trudi and Naseem's father (1 episode)
 Alicya Eyo as Sandi Mansfield; Rhona and Shona's mother (1 episode)
 Keicha Greenidge as Mercedes Garvey; Pupil and Eugene's sister (1 episode)
 Matt Greenwood as Martin Dunbar; Pupil (1 episode)
 Abigail Hardingham as Andi O'Donnell; Pupil (1 episode)
 Dominique Jackson as Evie Prior; Pupil (1 episode)
 Emily Joyce as Viv O'Donnell; Radio presenter and Andi's mother (1 episode)
 Andrew Knott as Greg Barrington; Journalist undercover as a teaching assistant (1 episode)
 Greg Kolpakchi as Yevhen Babicz; Danilo's brother (1 episode)
 Maeve Larkin as Julie Walker; Scout's foster mother (1 episode)
 Jacqueline Leonard as Pamela Dunbar; Martin's mother (1 episode)
 Tracy-Ann Oberman as Alison Drew; School inspector (1 episode)
 Kai Owen as Ken Watling; Professional rugby player (1 episode)
 Roxanne Pallett as Shelby Dixon; Pupil (1 episode)
 Paul Popplewell as Callum Pearson; Ali's abusive stepfather (1 episode)
 Jodie Prenger as Linda Wickes; Photographer (1 episode)
 Kelly Price as Sarah Diamond; Jez's ex-wife and Madi and Zack's mother (1 episode)
 Samantha Power as Sarah Pearson; Ali's mother (1 episode)
 Meriel Scholfield as Eileen Jackson; Freddie's mother (1 episode)
 Joseph Slack as Stuart Foley; Pupil (1 episode)
 Niek Versteeg as Freddie Jackson; Pupil (1 episode)

Episodes

{| class="wikitable plainrowheaders" width="100%"
|-
! style="background-color: #69359C; color: #FFFFFF;" colspan="8"|Autumn Term
|-
! style="background-color: #69359C; color: #FFFFFF;" | No.
! style="background-color: #69359C; color: #FFFFFF;" | Title
! style="background-color: #69359C; color: #FFFFFF;" | Directed by
! style="background-color: #69359C; color: #FFFFFF;" | Written by
! style="background-color: #69359C; color: #FFFFFF;" | Original air date
! style="background-color: #69359C; color: #FFFFFF;" | UK viewers(million)
|-

|-
! style="background-color: #69359C; color: #FFFFFF;" colspan="8"|Spring Term
|-

|-
! style="background-color: #69359C; color: #FFFFFF;" colspan="8"|Summer Term
|-

|}

DVD release
Four box sets of the seventh series have been released. Episodes 1-10 (Autumn Term) of the series were released on 17 October 2011,. Episodes 11-20 (Spring Term) were released on 26 March 2012. Episodes 21-30 (Summer Term) were released on 10 September 2012. All episodes in one boxset were released on 8 April 2013. They were released with a "12" British Board of Film Classification (BBFC) certificate (meaning it is unsuitable for viewing by those under the age of 12 years).

References

2011 British television seasons
2012 British television seasons
Waterloo Road (TV series)